Macleod Trail is a major road in Calgary, Alberta. It is a six- to eight-lane principal arterial road extending from downtown Calgary to the south of the city, where it merges into Highway 2. South of Anderson Road, Macleod Trail is an expressway and is slated to be upgraded to a freeway in the future. It is named for its destination to the south, Fort Macleod.

Route description
Macleod Trail effectively divides the southwest and the southeast quadrants of the city, and many communities (inner city as well as suburban) were developed along its course. Macleod Trail (along with Crowchild Trail and Deerfoot Trail) constitutes one of the three major north-south corridors of the city.

Beginning as a one-way street for northbound traffic (with southbound traffic following 1st Street SE one block to the west), the road passes by Calgary City Hall, Olympic Plaza, the building that housed the former Calgary Central Library, and the EPCOR Centre for the Performing Arts. South of downtown, it defines the western edge of the Calgary Stampede grounds, as it passes through the Beltline district, then provides access to the MNP Community & Sport Centre as it runs between the historic inner city communities of Mission and Ramsay. South of Elbow River, Macleod Trail becomes a two-way road and has various motels established on its sides, and Chinook Centre faces the road as it passes between the communities of Meadowlark Park, Kingsland and Fairview. Macleod Trail is lined with commercial developments on both sides for its entire length between Erlton and Lake Bonavista, including strip malls, auto malls, big-box stores and shopping centres such as Southcentre Mall, and Calgary's largest suburban office complex at Southland Park. The southern leg of the C-Train LRT system (Route 201) is also developed along Macleod Trail.

In November 2007, Calgary City Council approved a functional planning study for the portion of Macleod Trail that extends from Anderson Road north to Downtown. Expected recommendations include interchanges at Heritage Drive and Southland Drive, as well as possible traffic signal refinements. In addition, three other interchange locations are planned to be constructed within ten years. They are at the intersection with Lake Fraser Gate, at the intersection with 162 Avenue, and at the intersection with 194 Avenue. This would make Macleod Trail a freeway from Anderson Road to nearly the city limits. On August 13, 2017, the first diverging diamond interchange in Canada was opened at 162 Avenue.

Major intersections 
From north to south:

History

From 1949 to 1958, the Chinook Drive-In was located on McLeod Trail a half mile south of the Calgary city limits.

See also

Transportation in Calgary

References

Macleod
Roads in Calgary